The Norwegian Environment Agency was created on 1 July 2013 through a merger of the Norwegian Directorate for Nature Management and the Norwegian Climate and Pollution Agency.

The agency has about 700 employees. It has offices in Trondheim for nature management and in Oslo for climate and pollution management.

It is headed by Ellen Hambro.

References 

Government agencies of Norway
Government agencies established in 2013
Organisations based in Oslo
Environmental agencies
Ministry of Climate and Environment (Norway)